Chaerocina usambarensis is a moth of the  family Sphingidae. It is known from Tanzania.

References

Endemic fauna of Tanzania
Chaerocina
Moths described in 2008
Insects of Tanzania
Moths of Africa